Karin M. Rabe (born 1961) is an American condensed matter physicist known for her studies of ferroelectric materials, multiferroics, and martensites. She is a distinguished professor and Board of Governors Professor of physics at Rutgers University.

Education and career
Rabe graduated magna cum laude from Princeton University in 1982, with a bachelor's degree in physics. She completed her Ph.D. in 1987 at the Massachusetts Institute of Technology; her dissertation Ab initio Statistical Mechanics of Structural Phase Transitions was supervised by John Joannopoulos.

After postdoctoral research at AT&T Bell Laboratories, she joined Yale University as Clare Boothe Luce Assistant Professor of Applied Physics and Physics in 1989. She became full professor at Yale in 1999, and moved to Rutgers in 2000. At Rutgers, her doctoral students have included 2013 MacArthur "Genius" Award winner Craig Fennie.

Rabe also chairs the board of the Aspen Center for Physics.

Recognition
Rabe was named Board of Governors Professor by Rutgers in 2013.

In 2002, she was elected as a Fellow of the American Physical Society (APS), after a nomination from the APS Division of Materials Physics "for fundamental contributions to the development and application of theoretical and computational methods for the study of structural phase transitions in solids". Rabe won the David Adler Lectureship Award in the Field of Materials Physics for 2008 "for research, writings and presentations on the theory of structural phase transitions and for the application of first-principles electronic structure methods to the understanding of technologically important phenomena in ferroelectrics".

She was named a Fellow of the American Association for the Advancement of Science in 2011, and elected to both the American Academy of Arts and Sciences and the National Academy of Sciences in 2013.

References

External links
Home page

1961 births
Living people
American condensed matter physicists
American women physicists
Princeton University alumni
Massachusetts Institute of Technology alumni
Yale University faculty
Rutgers University faculty
Fellows of the American Physical Society
Fellows of the American Association for the Advancement of Science
Fellows of the American Academy of Arts and Sciences
Members of the United States National Academy of Sciences
American women academics
21st-century American women